Philo Records was a short-lived record company and label founded in 1945 by the brothers Eddie and Leo Messner. Soon after it was founded, the name was changed to Aladdin.

Philo's releases included 78 RPM singles of Illinois Jacquet, Wynonie Harris, Helen Humes with the Bill Doggett Octet, Jay McShann and Lester Young, and an album (set of two 78 RPM records) of Lester Young, Nat King Cole and Red Callender.

When the U.S. Patent Office refused to register the label because of the similarity in name with the Philco radio corporation, which produced blanks for the record industry, the dispute was settled when the owners agreed to continue the name as Medlee.

On March 2, the company placed an advertisement in Billboard magazine, announcing the new trade name. The next week, though, they placed a new ad "correcting their mistake", announcing Aladdin Records. The numbering of the releases was continued, and older Philo releases were reprinted as Aladdin.

This label should not be confused with the folk-music label Philo Records, founded by Bill Schubart and Michael Couture in Vermont, which is owned by Rounder Records.

See also
 List of record labels

References

External links
 Philo Records on the Internet Archive's Great 78 Project

Defunct record labels of the United States
Record labels established in 1945
Record labels disestablished in 1946